Seán O'Callaghan, born John Callaghan, (1918-2000) was an Irish journalist and non-fiction author.

Born in Killavullen, Co. Cork, after service in the Irish Army he moved to England, working as a journalist there and after 1952, as a correspondent in Africa. He later moved to Malta.
His 2001 book, To Hell or Barbados: The ethnic cleansing of Ireland, controversially claimed that many thousands of Irish people were transported to Barbados as slaves after the Cromwellian conquest of Ireland. Some scholars dispute this, saying that O'Callaghan confused slavery with indenture.

Selected publications
 The Easter Lily (1957)
 The Jackboot in Ireland. Allan Wingate, London, 1958.
 To Hell or Barbados: The ethnic cleansing of Ireland. O'Brien Press Ltd, Dublin, 2000

References 

Irish non-fiction writers
1918 births
2000 deaths